North Carolina Highway 149 (NC 149) is a primary state highway in the U.S. state of North Carolina. The highway provides direct access from US 64 to the Plymouth Pulp Mill.

Route description
NC 149 is a short  two-lane highway, connecting US 64 with the Domtar's Plymouth Pulp Mill, where they make Cellulose fiber and Fluff pulp.  A gate is located just past from where state maintenance ends.

History
NC 149 was established by 1987 as a new primary spur from US 64 to the Plymouth Pulp Mill, an upgrade of Ken Trowbridge Road (SR 1341).  It has remained unchanged since inception.

Junction list

References

External links

NCRoads.com: N.C. 149

149
Transportation in Washington County, North Carolina